Shay Martyn (born 15 November 2002) is a professional rugby league footballer who plays as a er for St Helens (Heritage № 1264) in the Betfred Super League.

Martyn made his first team début for Saints in September 2021 against the Salford Red Devils. 

Martyn is the son of former St Helens RLFC , Tommy Martyn, who enjoyed success with the club in the 1990s and 2000s, and whom is still a part of the Saints' backroom staff to this day.

References

External links
St Helens profile
Saints Heritage Society profile

2002 births
Living people
English rugby league players
Rugby league wingers
St Helens R.F.C. players